Ngaba may refer to:

 Ngaba (Democratic Republic of Congo), a small commune in the Democratic Republic of Congo
Ngawa Tibetan and Qiang Autonomous Prefecture, prefecture in Sichuan, China
Ngawa County, county in Ngawa Prefecture, Sichuan, China

fr:Ngaba
ln:Ngába